Rejoice and Be Merry!: Christmas with the Mormon Tabernacle Choir and Orchestra at Temple Square featuring The King's Singers was recorded during the Mormon Tabernacle Choir's 2007 Christmas shows in the LDS Conference Center with special guests The King's Singers.  The album was released on September 30, 2008 and a concert DVD was released on October 21, 2008.

The CD features both a cappella and accompanied songs by the Mormon Tabernacle Choir and Orchestra at Temple Square featuring The King's Singers. Six tracks feature the King's Singers alone, with another five tracks featuring the combined Mormon Tabernacle Choir, Orchestra at Temple Square and King's Singers, the remaining eight tracks feature the Mormon Tabernacle Choir and Orchestra at Temple Square.  The recorded concert was also broadcast on PBS stations in December 2008.

Track listing

Charts

References

Tabernacle Choir albums
2008 Christmas albums
Christmas albums by American artists
Christmas albums by British artists
A cappella albums